Stubai may mean:
 Stubai Alps, (German: Stubaier Alpen), a mountain range in the Central Eastern Alps of Europe
 Stubaital, the central valley of the Stubai Alps
 Stubai Valley Railway (German: Stubaitalbahn), an 18.2 km (11.31 mi) long narrow gauge interurban tram from Innsbruck to Fulpmes in Tyrol, Austria
 Stubai Bergsport-Mountaineering, an Austrian manufacturer of mountaineering equipment.